Lessebo Municipality (Lessebo kommun) is a municipality in eastern Kronoberg County in southern Sweden, where the town Lessebo is seat.

The nationwide local government reform of 1971 saw the creation of the present municipality, when three surrounding municipalities were amalgamated with the market town (köping) of Lessebo (itself instituted in 1939)

In its history, Lessebo Municipality still honours the Swedish emigration in the late 19th century, whereby many poor farmers from Sweden – many of them from Småland – emigrated to the U.S.. When Vilhelm Moberg wrote his acclaimed novels about this time, he located his main characters' home to the parish of Ljuder in eastern Lessebo Municipality. An honorary Walk of the Emigrants also stretches through the municipality and continues to Karlshamn in the south.

Localities
There are 4 urban areas (also called a Tätort or locality) in Lessebo Municipality.

In the table the localities are listed according to the size of the population as of December 31, 2005. The municipal seat is in bold characters.

Economy
Lessebo Municipality is best known for the manufacture of glassware. It is located in Sweden's so-called Glasriket (Realm of Glass), which also includes the municipalities of Uppvidinge, Emmaboda and Nybro.

The main glassblower company in Lessebo Municipality is Kosta Boda, established in 1742 as "Kosta". They offer instruction for students wanting to learn the field.

Besides the glass industry, Lessebo Municipality also has a manufacturer of handmade paper which was established in 1693, today an exclusive product mainly used for finer documents.

References

Statistics Sweden

External links

Lessebo Municipality - Official site
Glasriket - Official site, in Swedish, English and German
Walk of the Emigrants
Coat of arms

Municipalities of Kronoberg County